The 2010 AFL season was the 114th season of the Australian Football League (AFL), the highest level senior Australian rules football competition in Australia, which was known as the Victorian Football League until 1989. The season featured sixteen clubs, ran from 25 March until 2 October, and comprised a 22-game home-and-away season followed by a finals series featuring the top eight clubs.

The premiership was won by the Collingwood Football Club for the 15th time, after it defeated  by 56 points in the 2010 AFL Grand Final Replay.

Pre-season

AFL pre-season draft

AFL rookie draft

NAB Cup

Summary of results

Premiership season
The draw for the 2010 AFL Premiership Season was produced by the AFL with the intention of producing a balanced draw while also providing the fans and television networks with blockbuster games. In a competition with 16 teams and 22 rounds, it is not possible for all teams to play each other twice. These factors combine to create some of the following anomalies:
Six teams played each other for the first time in round 21;
Of the Victorian-based teams  played six games interstate while  travelled only three times;
Of the six games  played in Melbourne, none were at the MCG, while defending premiers  played seven games at the MCG despite not being one of the tenants at this ground;
 and  played only two of 2009's top eight teams twice, while  and  played five of these teams twice.

Round 1

Round 2

Round 3

Round 4

Round 5

Round 6

Round 7

Round 8

Round 9

Round 10

Round 11

Round 12

Round 13

Round 14

Round 15

Round 16

Round 17

Round 18

Round 19

Round 20

Round 21

Round 22

Win/loss table

Bold – Home game

Ladder

Ladder progression

Finals series

Week one

Week two

Week three

Weeks four/five

Grand final replay

Season records
Biggest margin: 116 points – , 24.11 (155) vs  5.9 (39), Aurora Stadium, round 21
Smallest margin (excluding draws): 1 point –
, 12.14 (86) vs  12.13 (85), MCG, round 2
, 8.13 (61) vs  8.12 (60), AAMI Stadium, round 20
Drawn Games:
 11.10 (76) vs  9.22 (76), MCG, round 12
 14.3 (87) vs  13.9 (87), Etihad Stadium, round 17
 9.14 (68) vs  10.8 (68), MCG, Grand Final
Highest Score: 24.18 (162) – ,  10.4 (64) vs  24.18 (162), MCG, round 20
Highest Aggregate Score: 40.17 (257) –   16.6 (102) vs  24.11 (155), MCG, round 6
Lowest Score: 3.12 (30) – , 3.12 (30) vs  10.17 (77), AAMI Stadium, round 10
Lowest Aggregate Score: 13.17 (95) –  6.10 (46) vs  7.7 (49), Etihad Stadium, round 6
Longest Winning Streak: 9 games – , rounds 13–21
Longest Losing Streak: 9 games –
, rounds 1–9
, rounds 8–16
Most goals kicked by a player in a match: 12.2 (74) – Mark LeCras, Final score:  14.16 (100) vs 20.12 (132), Etihad Stadium, round 16

Awards 
The Brownlow Medal was awarded to Chris Judd of  who received 30 votes.
Scott Pendlebury was awarded the second medal in the Replay.
The Wooden Spoon was "awarded" to the West Coast Eagles.
The AFL Players Association awards were as follows:

Best and fairest

AFL Rising Star

The AFL Rising Star is awarded to the best player who, as of the beginning of the season, is under the age of 21 and has played fewer than 10 games. Each week one player is nominated and at the end of the season a selection panel votes to select the overall winner.

Sydney's Dan Hannebery won the award for 2010, with the maximum 45 votes awarded to him.

Nominations
 Round 1 – Chris Yarran (Carlton)
 Round 2 – Dan Hannebery (Sydney)
 Round 3 – Ryan Bastinac (North Melbourne)
 Round 4 – Nic Naitanui (West Coast)
 Round 5 – Jack Trengove (Melbourne)
 Round 6 – Todd Banfield (Brisbane)
 Round 7 – Tom Scully (Melbourne)
 Round 8 – Jake Melksham (Essendon)
 Round 9 – Nathan Fyfe (Fremantle)
 Round 10 – Dustin Martin† (Richmond)
 Round 11 – Jordan Gysberts (Melbourne)
 Round 12 – Ben Reid (Collingwood)
 Round 13 – Tom Rockliff (Brisbane Lions)
 Round 14 – Ben Stratton (Hawthorn)
 Round 15 – Jack Redden (Brisbane Lions)
 Round 16 – Phil Davis (Adelaide)
 Round 17 – Jarrad Grant† (Western Bulldogs)
 Round 18 – Michael Hurley (Essendon)
 Round 19 – Jeff Garlett (Carlton)
 Round 20 – Jackson Trengove (Port Adelaide)
 Round 21 – Sam Wright (North Melbourne)
 Round 22 – Anthony Morabito (Fremantle)

† players ineligible due to tribunal sanction

Voting
Dan Hannebery – 45
Tom Scully – 35
Tom Rockliff – 24
Jack Trengove – 11
Ryan Bastinac – 6
Jeff Garlett – 5
Nathan Fyfe – 3
Michael Hurley – 2
Nic Naitanui – 2
Ben Reid – 1
Ben Stratton – 1

Goal of the Year

The Australian Football League celebrates the best goal of the season through the annual Goal of the Year competition. From 2010 onwards, the commercial name for the award is the Panasonic Goal of the Year.

Lance 'Buddy' Franklin won the award for his running goal against Essendon in round 13. By winning the award Franklin became the fifth indigenous player to win the award since 2004.

Nominations
 Round 1 – Brendan Fevola (Brisbane)
 Round 2 – Michael Osborne (Hawthorn)
 Round 3 – Matthew Pavlich (Fremantle)
 Round 4 – Carl Peterson (Hawthorn)
 Round 5 – Stephen Milne (St Kilda)
 Round 6 – Daniel Bradshaw (Sydney)
 Round 7 – Jamie Bennell (Melbourne)
 Round 8 – Brent Harvey (North Melbourne)
 Round 9 – Brendan Fevola (Brisbane)
 Round 10 – Marc Murphy (Carlton)
 Round 11 – Stephen Milne (St Kilda)
 Round 12 – Stephen Milne (St Kilda)
 Round 13 – Lance Franklin (Hawthorn)
 Round 14 – Patrick Dangerfield (Adelaide)
 Round 15 – Rhyce Shaw (Sydney)
 Round 16 – Mark LeCras (West Coast)
 Round 17 – Mark LeCras (West Coast)
 Round 18 – Alan Didak (Collingwood)
 Round 19 – Chance Bateman (Hawthorn)
 Round 20 – Liam Jurrah (Melbourne)
 Round 21 – Cyril Rioli (Hawthorn)
 Round 22 – Lynden Dunn (Melbourne)

Mark of the Year

The Australian Football League celebrates the best mark of the season through the annual Mark of the Year competition. From 2009 onwards, the commercial name for the award is the Hungry Jack's Mark of the Year.

Liam Jurrah, of the Melbourne Football Club, won the award for his mark over the top of Port Adelaide's Nick Salter, in round 21. However, he hadn't been nominated as Mark of the Week, which was won by Brendon Goddard. This inconsistency arose because the Mark of the Week is decided by an online public vote, while the Mark of the Year is decided separately by a panel of experts.

Weekly winners
 Round 1 – Trent Cotchin (Richmond)
 Round 2 – Nick Riewoldt (St Kilda)
 Round 3 – Brett Ebert (Port Adelaide)
 Round 4 – Jesse White (Sydney)
 Round 5 – David Wojcinski (Geelong)
 Round 6 – Colin Sylvia (Melbourne)
 Round 7 – Jamie Bennell (Melbourne)
 Round 8 – Justin Koschitzke (St Kilda)
 Round 9 – Jack Riewoldt (Richmond)
 Round 10 – Carl Peterson (Hawthorn)
 Round 11 – Jack Riewoldt (Richmond)
 Round 12 – Justin Koschitzke (St Kilda)
 Round 13 – Michael Osborne (Hawthorn)
 Round 14 – Scott Gumbleton (Essendon)
 Round 15 – Jack Riewoldt (Richmond)
 Round 16 – Luke McPharlin (Fremantle)
 Round 17 – Aaron Edwards (North Melbourne)
 Round 18 – Darren Jolly (Collingwood)
 Round 19 – Dale Thomas (Collingwood)
 Round 20 – Nick Riewoldt (St Kilda)
 Round 21 – Brendon Goddard (St Kilda)
 Round 22 – Brendon Goddard (St Kilda)
 Overall winner: Liam Jurrah (Melbourne, round 21)

Club leadership

Umpiring and rule changes
No major changes to the rules were introduced for the 2010 season.  Minor adjustments to the tribunal rules were made, including adding a provision to report players for diving or staging. The 2010 NAB Cup pre-season competition trialled three new rules: allowing boundary umpires to award free kicks, letting the players, not the umpire, decide if they want to use the advantage rule and penalising players who push the ball under another player.

Coach changes

References

External links
Official AFL website
2010 Season – AFL Tables

Australian Football League seasons
AFL Season